Albert "Albie" Murphy (November 1930 in Dublin – June 2000 in Dublin) was an Irish former professional football player.

He joined Clyde in Scotland from Transport in 1949, but returned to Ireland with Shamrock Rovers in 1951. He then rejoined Clyde for many years winning the Scottish Cup with them twice in 1955 and 1958.

He resigned for Shamrock Rovers again in September 1959 for £750. Murphy was forced to move as he was barred from Scottish football. He had become a bookmaker and opened a betting shop in Dublin and rendered himself ineligible to continue to play in the Scottish League.

He took over as coach in September 1960 for one season.

Murphy was capped by Ireland once in a friendly on 19 October 1955, playing in a defeat to Yugoslavia at Dalymount Park. In addition, he represented the League of Ireland XI against the Scottish League XI in 1949.

Murphy was known for his fiery temper, with two notable instances of this occurring in games against Rangers. He was sent off at least twice against Rangers in his career, once in a Glasgow Cup final in 1956, where he refused to leave the field and had to be escorted away by the police. He was given a two-month ban by the Scottish Football Association for this incident. On another occasion, Murphy was sent off against Rangers following a fight on the pitch.

Honours 
Clyde
Scottish Cup: 1954–55, 1957–58
Scottish Division Two: 1956–57
Glasgow Cup: 1958–59; Runner-up: 1956–57
Glasgow Charity Cup: 1957–58; Runner-up: 1958–59

References

Republic of Ireland association footballers
Republic of Ireland international footballers
Clyde F.C. players
Shamrock Rovers F.C. players
Shamrock Rovers F.C. managers
League of Ireland players
League of Ireland managers
1930 births
2000 deaths
Scottish Football League players
Transport F.C. players
Association football defenders
Republic of Ireland football managers